Welsh folklore is the collective term for the folklore of the Welsh people. It encompasses topics related to Welsh mythology, but also include the nation's folk tales, customs, and oral tradition.

Welsh folklore is related to Irish folklore and Scottish folklore from its Celtic traditions as well as English folklore, but it shares most similarities with the Brythonic cultures of Brittany and Cornwall.

See also
Welsh Mythology

References

Further reading
 Juliette M. Wood (1988). "Classifying Folk Narrative Using the Type/Motif Method: A Case-Study on Welsh Material". In: Folk Life, 27:1, pp. 95-103. DOI: 10.1179/flk.1988.27.1.95

Welsh culture
Welsh mythology
Brythonic Celts